The Mosquito was an Italian wire-guided anti-tank missile developed by the Swiss firm Contraves AG in close cooperation with the German firm of Bölkow, and produced by its Italian subsidiary Contraves Italiana SpA. It entered service with the Italian Army in 1961 and Indonesian armed forces. It was broadly similar to anti-tank missiles of the era, having a fibreglass body with four large wings, cruciform in cross-section and a relatively short body.

The missile is transported in a cuboid container that also acts as a launcher. The launcher is attached to a control box that is equipped with a binocular sight and control joystick. When the missile is launched the operator steers the missile using the joystick. He first "gathers" the missile to his line of sight to the target.

It is steered in flight by vibrating spoilers in the wings, and spins for additional stabilization, with a pyrotechnically spun gyroscope providing stabilization. Some Mosquito missiles are on display at the Schweizerisches Militärmuseum Full.

Operators

Specifications

 Length: 1.11 m 
 Diameter: 0.12 m
 Wingspan: 0.6 m
 Weight: 14.1 kg
 Range 350 m to 2400 m
 Peak speed: 90 m/s
 Warhead: Either 4 kg hollow charge (660 mm versus RHA) or fragmentation
 Propulsion: Two-stage solid rocket motor.

References

 
 Schweizerische Militärmuseum Full

Anti-tank guided missiles of the Cold War
Guided missiles of Italy
Military equipment introduced in the 1960s